is a Japanese voice actor from Tokyo, Japan.

Filmography

Television animation
Star Ocean EX (2001) as Gyoro
RahXephon (2002) as Underling B (Ep 19)

Unknown date
Aquarian Age the Movie as Announcer
Beyblade as Bill (ep 41)
Boruto: Naruto Next Generations as Kokuri
Burst Angel as RAPT Commander
Captain Tsubasa as Mamoru Izawa (as an adolescent)
Chrono Crusade as Carv
Full Metal Panic! as Goddard; Savage A (ep 17)
Gakuen Utopia Manabi Straight! as Shimojima
Getbackers as thief (ep 38)
Gravion as Lab Scientist
Kamichu! as English Teacher (DVD ep 15); Kaineshi/Dog Rider (DVD ep 5, 6, 16); Oyadama-Kaze/Boss Wind (DVD ep 1); Referee (DVD ep 8); Sendou-Chagama/Boatman Teapot (DVD ep 2, 7)
Kiddy Grade as Bols; Broadcaster; Father; Information officer
Legend of Himiko as haniwa soldier
Les Misérables - Shoujo Cosette as Grocer (ep 1)
Magical Project S (eps 1–2,10-11,20,22-23)
Munto 2: Beyond the Walls of Time as First Lieutenant
Ninja Scroll as Kikori
R.O.D the TV as Newscaster (ep. 17); Toastmaster (ep. 10)
Sakura Diaries as Coach
Space Pirate Mito as Nandabu
Tenchi in Tokyo
Tenchi Universe as Pirate B (ep 10)
Transformers: Cybertron as Inch-Up; Signal Lancer; Sonic Bomber
You're Under Arrest as Bomb Squad [group] (ep 30); Crook (ep 10, 13); Customer (ep 19); Fisher (ep 38); Imamura (ep 20); Keihin Tohoku Line Driver (ep 37); Male Officer; Middle-Aged Man (ep 25); Reporter (ep 24); Tower Employee A (ep 34–35); Tsuyama (ep 12); Uemura (ep 21); Waiter (ep 22); Wolfman (ep 40)

Original video animation (OVA)
Yukikaze (2002)

Theatrical animation
Spriggan (1998)

Drama CDs
Aisaresugite Kodoku series 2: Itoshisugita Shifuku (Tanaka)
Analyst no Yuutsu series 3: Yuuwaku no Target Price (Shinjirou Tsujitani)
Bad Boys! (Torayasu Hodate)

References

External links
Takayasu Usui's profile at Sigma7.co.jp 

People from Tokyo
Japanese male voice actors
Living people
Year of birth missing (living people)